Terrace is a city located near the Skeena River in British Columbia, Canada. The community is the regional retail and service hub for the northwestern portion of British Columbia. With a current population of over 12,000 within municipal boundaries, the city services surrounding communities as well bringing the Greater Terrace Area population to over 18,000 residents. The Kitselas and Kitsumkalum people, tribes of the Tsimshian Nation, have lived in the Terrace area for thousands of years. The individual Indigenous communities neighbour the city with Kitselas to the east and Kitsumkalum to the west.

Terrace was originally called Littleton, but this name was rejected by postal authorities because of possible confusion with Lyttleton, a town in New Brunswick.  The new name is descriptive of the manner in which the land rises from the river.

As northwest British Columbia's main services and transportation hub, Terrace is intersected by the Canadian National Railway as well as Highway 16 (running east to west) and Highway 37 South. Air services are provided at Northwest Regional Airport, with connections to Prince George, Smithers and Vancouver. The Terrace railway station is served by Via Rail's Jasper – Prince Rupert train. Health care in Terrace is administered by Northern Health and provided in part by Mills Memorial Hospital.

History and culture

First Nations peoples

Indigenous peoples have inhabited Northwest British Columbia for generations. The region is one of the oldest continuously occupied regions of the world and, long before European contact, was one of the most densely populated areas north of Mexico. The flat mountain ranges surrounding Terrace are traditionally called Ganeeks Laxha, which in the Tsimshian language means the "Stairway to Heaven". Kitselas and Kitsumkalum are two Tsimshian communities in the Terrace area that continue to access traditional tribal and clan-based territories in northwest British Columbia. The Skeena River was initially known as the K'shian River, meaning "where the mist comes out" — ksi, to come out from; yeen (hian-mist), clouds. The Tsimshian Nation's traditional economy was based on hunting, fishing and social gatherings, for domestic consumption or trade, on their traditional lands. For the aboriginal people, the Skeena River was used for transportation, communication, war, trade, as a source of food, and at times for protection.

Steamboats

In 1866 the steamer Mumford made it as far as Kitsumkalum with supplies for the Collins Overland Telegraph line. It took an average of three days to travel from Port Essington (at the mouth of the Skeena River, near Prince Rupert) to Hazelton. It was not until 1891 that the Hudson's Bay Company sternwheeler Caledonia successfully negotiated the Kitselas Canyon and reached Hazelton. A number of other steamers were built around the turn of the century, in part due to the growing fishing industry and the Klondike Gold Rush. In honour of its steamboat heritage, Terrace celebrates a festival called Riverboat Days each summer.

George Little
Ontarian George Little arrived in the Skeena River valley in March 1905. While travelling from the Yukon by snowshoe on the Kitimat trail en route to the Bulkley Valley, he liked what he saw in the area, decided to remain, and staked claim later in the year to many acres of what would later be Terrace.

The riverboats operated on the Skeena for only 22 years; the last boat, the Inlander, finished up in September 1912, when the Grand Trunk Pacific Railway took over its function. George Little donated  to the Grand Trunk Pacific Railway. The station stop was originally named "Littleton"; however, as there was already a Littleton in New Brunswick, Little changed the name to "Terrace" in reference to the local geography and the traditional Tsimshian name for the area. Little established a sawmill to accommodate the demand for railway ties. In 1955, Little rode the first CNR train to Kitimat, passing over the same route he had trekked one half century earlier.

Old Skeena Bridge

The Old Skeena Bridge officially opened July 1925, halting the use of the Ferry Island ferry service to Thornhill Creek. Site of Tom Thornhill  and Eliza Wright, homestead. In 1944, the Skeena River Highway between Terrace and Prince Rupert was ceremoniously opened with a convoy of Canadian and American army bands that were part of the troops stationed there during World War II. Terrace could now easily transport to anywhere in British Columbia.

During the construction of the rail line to Kitimat in the early 1950s, new pilings were poured beside the existing structure and the bridge deck was moved to the new, higher pilings. The original pilings were then used to hold a new rail bridge across the Skeena River for the CNR line to Kitimat. This arrangement is still in place today.

This bridge now shares its load with the Dudley Little Bridges (often referred to as the New Skeena Bridges), a series of two two-way bridges crossing both channels of the Skeena River at Ferry Island and creating a bypass route of downtown Terrace for Highway 16. The new bridges, constructed circa 1975, are fully paved and offer uninterrupted two-way traffic flow, as opposed to the old single-lane bridge controlled by traffic lights. The foundations of the new bridge are prepared for future twinning. The Old Skeena Bridge was once noted for being the largest curved wooden-plank bridge in North America until its decking was replaced with metal grate decking in 2002 due to concerns of safety and upkeep. A concrete-surfaced pedestrian section was installed at the same time, behind an existing divider, to allow for safe bicycle and pedestrian use of the structure with the removal of the solid wooden deck planks.

The bridge is now registered as a national historic site.

Terrace Mutiny

During World War II, military units composed primarily of conscripts from central and eastern Canada were stationed in Terrace. Morale was low due to the poor relationship between the soldiers and the local populace, the isolation, the damp weather, lack of recreation, crowded facilities, and the distance from home. In late 1944, because of declining enlistment and heavy casualties, Prime Minister William Lyon Mackenzie King was forced to reconsider his promise to not deploy conscripts overseas. Mackenzie King decided to a one-time assignment of conscripts for overseas service. On November 24, 1944, news that conscripts might be sent overseas triggered a mutiny amongst the men stationed in Terrace. It took until November 29 for officers to restore order to the troops. The Terrace Mutiny was the most serious breach of discipline in Canadian military history.

Geography
The lush forests in the area consist primarily of western red cedar, western hemlock, amabilis fir or "balsam" and Sitka spruce. The dominant soil in Terrace is a well-drained sandy loam with classic podzol profile development where the original forest remains.

The Hazelton Mountains are to the east of the city, while the Kitimat Ranges of the Coast Mountains are to the west. The area sits above an active fault line that runs north–south. The area also boasts several natural and developed hotsprings.

Climate
Being close to the Pacific Coast, Terrace has a continental climate (Köppen climate classification Dfb).

October to February are the wettest months. Predominant winds are from the west and southwest, but occasional northerners during the winter bring snow in.

Demographics

Religion

Ethnicity 
As of the 2021 census in the Terrace census agglomeration area, the panethnic breakdown is European, Indigenous, South Asian, East Asian, Southeast Asian, African, Latin American, and Middle Eastern.

Economy

Terrace was once the cedar pole capital of the world. Over 50,000 poles were manufactured annually to supply many parts of North America with telephone and electric power poles. For many years, logging was the region's major industry, but shrank considerably in the years after 2005; however, forestry is still a major economic driver in the region with one medium-sized sawmill (Skeena Sawmills, owned by ROC Holdings) and log exports supporting a modestly busy sector. Terrace's employment includes a large public sector workforce, recently supplemented with an influx of private companies arriving to support Liquified Natural Gas projects in the region. Many people in Terrace also commute to Kitimat to work at Alcan. The city has continually tried to reinvent itself as a service hub for northwestern British Columbia.

In 2001, the community was significantly affected by problems with and the eventual closure of the largest local employer, the former Skeena Cellulose Inc. sawmill. The mill was bought by Terrace Lumber Co., a group of local owners, and reopened in late August 2005, but did not prosper and closed in mid-2006. By the end of 2006, the remaining equipment was auctioned off and the mill was torn down. The mill's former site is now a vacant lot has been cleared and is ready for new development .

Current economic prospects are linked to tourism, mineral developments to the north and northwest, construction of a power line towards Iskut and energy-related developments in Kitimat. The latter include the LNG Canada liquefied natural gas (LNG) plant and terminal project planned in Kitimat, which has been formally confirmed early October 2018 by its shareholders, led by Royal Dutch Shell, with completion planned for 2024–2025, as well as from the related Coastal GasLink Pipeline project of TransCanada Corporation.

To the west of Terrace, the Prince Rupert ocean container port expansion has resulted in increased rail traffic by CN Rail in recent years. In 2004, a Wal-Mart centre was built in Terrace (store 5834). The Skeena mall underwent a large-scale renovation that was completed in 2013. The ski resort Northern Escape Heli-skiing is based in Terrace.

Arts and culture
During the summer, Terrace offers many outdoor activities, such as fishing for a wide range of freshwater fish, mountain biking, hiking, kiting and hunting in the surrounding areas. In the fall, many of Terrace's inhabitants go out to search for pine mushrooms (Tricholoma magnivelare), and pick berries. There is a variety of winter sports available in Terrace and the surrounding region including skiing and snowboarding at nearby Shames Mountain, as well as snowmobiling, ice fishing, curling, and ice skating.

Education
Terrace is in School District 82 Coast Mountains, along with Kitimat, Stewart, and Hazelton. There is one senior secondary school in Terrace, Caledonia Senior Secondary School, which serves grades 10, 11 and 12. Terrace is also home to a distance education school, North Coast Distance Education School, which serves all grades from kindergarten to grade 12 and adults. There is one middle school, Skeena Middle School, and one public Francophone primary school, école Jack-Cook, operated by the Conseil scolaire francophone de la Colombie-Britannique. Centennial Christian School is also within the town limits, and provides classes from preschool to grade 12.

The main campus of the Coast Mountain College is in Terrace, where it was established in 1975. The college includes the Freda Diesing School of Northwest Coast Art, which offers courses related to First Nations art.

The University of Northern British Columbia (UNBC) has a regional campus at 4837 Keith Avenue, the Northwest Campus. An additional location is housed on the Prince Rupert Coast Mountain College (CMTN) campus.

Media

Newspapers
 Terrace Standard
 Terrace Daily

Radio
 AM 590 – CFTK, adult contemporary
 FM 92.1 – CFNR-FM, First Nations community / classic rock
 FM 95.3 – CBTH-FM, CBC Radio One (repeats CFPR, Prince Rupert)
 FM 96.9 – CBUF-FM-3, Première Chaîne (repeats CBUF-FM, Vancouver)
 FM 103.1 – CJFW-FM, country

Television
 Channel 3 – CFTK-TV, CTV 2 owned-and-operated station

Notable people
 Jeff Sharples, Hockey Player
 Dale Kushner, Hockey Player
 Wade Flaherty, Hockey Player
 Ian Bagg, Comedian
 Dudley George Little, Politician
 Caleb Brousseau,  Para-alpine Skier, Olympian
 Alayne Fleischmann,  Lawyer
 Michelle Hendry,  Basketball Player, Olympian
 Brenda Silsbe,  Children's Author

Bibliography

References

External links

 
Cities in British Columbia